The Practavia Sprite is a British two-seat homebuilt training or touring monoplane designed for amateur construction. It was the winning entry in a competition sponsored by Pilot magazine in 1968. The design had been begun as a magazine-sponsored project by Peter Garrison, who worked for Pilot at the time; when the project did not move forward rapidly enough to suit him, he returned to the United States, where he modified his design into what would become his first Melmoth.

Development
The prototype Sprite, named the Pilot Sprite, was designed by a team at Loughborough University and had little in common with Garrison's design, though both were all-metal side-by-side low-wing cantilever monoplanes with tricycle landing gear. The Sprite was powered by a Rolls-Royce Continental O-240-A piston engine. Plans for amateur building were marketed by Practavia Ltd as the Practavia Sprite.

Specifications

References

 
 
 

1970s British civil utility aircraft
Homebuilt aircraft
Loughborough University
Garrison aircraft
Low-wing aircraft
Single-engined tractor aircraft
Aircraft first flown in 1971